A computer lab is a space where computer services are provided to a defined community. These are typically public libraries and academic institutions. Generally, users must follow a certain user policy to retain access to the computers. This usually consists of rules such as no illegal activity during use or attempts to circumvent any security or content-control software while using the computers. 

Computer labs are often subject to time limits in order to allow more people access to use the lab. It is also common for personal login credentials to be required for access. This allows institutions to track the user's activities for any possible fraudulent use. The computers in computer labs are typically equipped with internet access, scanners, and printers and are typically arranged in rows. This is to give the workstation a similar view to facilitate lecturing or presentations, and also to facilitate small group work. 

For some academic institutions, student laptops or laptop carts  take place of dedicated computer labs. However, computer labs still have a place in applications requiring special software or hardware which are not easily accessible in personal computers.

Purposes

While computer labs are generally multipurpose, some labs may contain computers with hardware or software optimized for certain tasks or processes, depending on the needs of the institution operating the lab. These specialized purposes may include video editing, stock trading, 3-D computer-aided design, programming, and GIS. Increasingly, these have become the main purposes for the existence of traditional desktop-style computer labs, due to rising ownership of inexpensive personal computers making use of the lab only necessary when the expensive, specialized software and more powerful computers needed to run it are required.

Arrangements

Alternatives

In some settings, traditional desktop computer labs are impractical due to the requirement of a dedicated space. Because of this, some labs use laptop carts instead of desktop setups, in order to both save space and give the lab some degree of mobility.
In the context of academic institutions, some traditional desktop computer labs are being phased out in favor of other solutions judged to be more efficient given that most students own personal laptops. One of these solutions is a virtual lab, which can allow users to install software from the lab server onto their own laptops or log into virtual machines remotely, essentially turning their own laptops into lab machines.

Similar spaces

Media lab
A media lab (often referred to as "new media lab" or "media research lab") is a term used for interdisciplinary organizations, collectives or spaces with the main focus on new media, digital culture and technology.  The MIT Media Lab is a well-known example of a media lab.

Internet café

An Internet café differs from a computer lab in that usage of a computer lab is generally free for those with access, while Internet cafés charge for computer use. The term 'Internet café' is often used interchangeably with 'computer lab' but may differ from a computer lab in that users can also connect to the Internet using their own computer or device, and users of a computer lab generally do not need any equipment of their own.

See also
Computer science
Computers in the classroom
School library
Kiosk software
Public computer
LAN gaming center

References

External links

Centralized computing
Laboratory types
Rooms
Articles containing video clips
Educational facilities